Gordon Edmondson Burniston (born 1885) was a professional footballer, who played for Huddersfield Town, & Merthyr Town.

References

1885 births
Year of death missing
People from Knaresborough
English footballers
Association football midfielders
English Football League players
Huddersfield Town A.F.C. players
Merthyr Town F.C. players
Sportspeople from Yorkshire